The Madan Mahal - Ambikapur Intercity Express is an Intercity train of the Indian Railways connecting Madan Mahal near Jabalpur city in Madhya Pradesh and Ambikapur of Chhattisgarh.

Number and nomenclature

The train was announced in the railway budget 2009–2010 by railway minister Mamata Banerjee. The train number is 11265/11266.
This train has great importance specially for the passengers travelling from Jabalpur to Ambikapur as time taken to reach Ambikapur has reduced drastically. To decongest the load of train in Jabalpur Railway station, the train was recently shifted to its new terminal, Madan Mahal

Departure and arrival

This train runs daily. The train will depart from Madan Mahal as origin and will reach up to Ambikapur. The train departs from Madan Mahal everyday at 13:40 and reach Ambikpaur at 23:00.
From Ambikpur the train departs everyday at 6:15 and reach Madan Mahal at 15:15

Route and halts 

The important halts of the train are:

 
 
 
 
 
 
 
 Kotma
 Bijuri

Coach composite

The train has standard ICF rakes with max speed of 110 kmph. The train consists of 15 coaches:

 1 AC III Tier Chair Car
 10 Chair Car
 2 General
 2 Second-class Luggage/parcel van

Traction

Both trains are hauled by a Katni Loco Shed based WAP-5 diesel locomotive from Madan Mahal to Ambikapur and vice versa.

Rake Sharing 

This train shares its rake with 11651/11652 Madan Mahal–Singrauli Intercity Express.

Notes

See also

 Sarguja Express
 Jabalpur - Singrauli Intercity Express
 Jabalpur - Habibganj Intercity Express
 Jabalpur–Rewa Intercity Express

Rail transport in Madhya Pradesh
Intercity Express (Indian Railways) trains
Rail transport in Chhattisgarh
Transport in Jabalpur
Railway services introduced in 2009